Teton County is a county in the U.S. state of Montana. As of the 2020 census, the population was 6,226. Its county seat is Choteau. The county was founded in 1893.

Geography

Adjacent counties

 Pondera County – north
 Chouteau County – east
 Cascade County – southeast
 Lewis and Clark County – south
 Flathead County – west

National protected area
Lewis and Clark National Forest (part)
Rocky Mountain Front Conservation Area (part)

Demographics

2000 census
As of the 2000 United States census, there were 6,445 people, 2,538 households, and 1,761 families in the county. The population density was 3 people per square mile (1/km2). There were 2,910 housing units at an average density of 1 per square mile (0.5/km2). The racial makeup of the county was 96.31% White, 0.19% Black or African American, 1.52% Native American, 0.09% Asian, 0.42% from other races, and 1.47% from two or more races.  1.13% of the population were Hispanic or Latino of any race. 26.0% were of German, 14.2% Norwegian, 9.9% English, 8.9% American and 8.8% Irish ancestry. 92.7% spoke English and 6.1% German as their first language.

There were 2,538 households, out of which 31.60% had children under the age of 18 living with them, 61.10% were married couples living together, 5.90% had a female householder with no husband present, and 30.60% were non-families. 27.30% of all households were made up of individuals, and 13.90% had someone living alone who was 65 years of age or older. The average household size was 2.51 and the average family size was 3.09.

The county population contained 27.30% under the age of 18, 6.10% from 18 to 24, 24.60% from 25 to 44, 25.40% from 45 to 64, and 16.60% who were 65 years of age or older.  The median age was 40 years. For every 100 females there were 97.00 males.  For every 100 females age 18 and over, there were 96.00 males.

The median income for a household in the county was $30,197, and the median income for a family was $36,662. Males had a median income of $25,794 versus $18,389 for females. The per capita income for the county was $14,635. About 12.20% of families and 16.60% of the population were below the poverty line, including 25.60% of those under age 18 and 8.40% of those age 65 or over.

2010 census
As of the 2010 United States census, there were 6,073 people, 2,450 households, and 1,643 families residing in the county. The racial makeup of the county was 96.3% white, 1.4% American Indian, 0.1% Asian, 0.2% from other races, and 1.9% from two or more races. Those of Hispanic or Latino origin made up 1.3% of the population. In terms of ancestry, 40.2% were German, 14.7% were Norwegian, 14.5% were Irish, 11.9% were English, 6.4% were Swedish, 6.0% were Dutch, and 4.3% were American.

Of the 2,450 households, 25.7% had children under the age of 18 living with them, 58.2% were married couples living together, 6.0% had a female householder with no husband present, 32.9% were non-families, and 29.3% of all households were made up of individuals. The average household size was 2.29 and the average family size was 2.83. The median age was 45.8 years.

The median income for a household in the county was $39,516 and the median income for a family was $49,102. Males had a median income of $34,824 versus $24,419 for females. The per capita income for the county was $20,509. About 11.0% of families and 12.8% of the population were below the poverty line, including 13.3% of those under age 18 and 13.5% of those age 65 or over.

Politics
Teton County voters have not selected the Democratic Party candidate in a national election since 1964.

Communities

City
 Choteau (county seat)

Towns
 Dutton
 Fairfield

Census-designated places
 Bynum
 Miller Colony
 New Rockport Colony
 Pendroy
 Power
 Rockport Colony

Unincorporated communities
Agawam

 Blackleaf
 Collins
 Diamond Valley
 Farmington
 Golden Ridge
 Koyl
 Saypo

Notable people
 Joe De Yong, artist, sculptor, illustrator, Hollywood movie technical advisor and protégé of Charles M. Russell; lived in Choteau, 1924
 John Edward Erickson, Teton County Attorney (1897–1905), governor of Montana

See also
 List of lakes in Teton County, Montana
 List of mountains in Teton County, Montana
 National Register of Historic Places listings in Teton County, Montana

References

 
1893 establishments in Montana
Populated places established in 1893